Communism in Quebec is a social and political movement aimed to reject the socioeconomic, liberal capitalist order and to establish the idea of Commons – common means of production and of exchange, the abolishment of social classes, State, and private property in Quebec and elsewhere.

By its subversive nature, the Quebec communist movement has always been repressed and marginalized by the Canadian and Quebec governments (see Section 98 of the Criminal Code of Canada, the Padlock Law and the War Measures Act) .  The only Canadian communist federal MP, Fred Rose was elected in Quebec.

Parties
 Communist Party of Quebec (1965–present)
 Marxist–Leninist Party of Quebec (1973–present)

Further reading 
Communists plan post-election fightback as Canadians head to the polls

References

 
Political history of Canada